The National Oncologic Institute or ION is a specialized hospital for cancer treatment, located in Panama City, Panama. Between August 2000 and March 2001, patients receiving radiation treatment for prostate cancer and cancer of the cervix received lethal doses of radiation, resulting in eight fatalities.

History

In 1936, President Juan Demóstenes Arosemena (a physician), conceived the creation of the National Radiologic Institute, an institution dedicated to treat cancer. The treatments were given on the Santo Tomas Hospital and on the former Panama Hospital.

On September 18, 1940, during the administration of President Augusto Boyd, the new facilities of the National Radiologic Institute were inaugurated, giving it its own building. The Institute was part of the Santo Tomas Hospital. This institute had 4 doctors, 3 nurses, and 40 beds. The treatments they had were radiotherapy, implantation of Radium needles, injections of hydrogenated mustard and surgery.

Initially, the institute focused more on palliative care. In 1965, a more active role in the battle against cancer is started, when the latest advancements of the time are applied in the detection and treatment of this illness.

Later that year the National Radiologic Institute was renamed Juan Demóstenes Arosemena Cancerologic Center, as a recognition of the work of this physician and creator of the institution. A cobalt-60 pump was acquired.

On 1980, the institution begins relations with the government of Japan, that was interested on the treatment of cancer in Panama, and by which a donation of medical and surgical equipment, including ultrasound, X-rays, and others are acquired.

On 1984, by law 11, the National Oncologic Institute (Instituto Oncologico Nacional) Juan Demóstenes Arosemena is created.

On June 3, 1999, the Panamanian Government, on President Ernesto Perez Balladares administration, gives buildings 242 and 254 of the former Gorgas Hospital to the Institute, and on July 23 the Institute moves to this location from the building on Justo Arosemena Avenue.

The Hospital has continued its growth and acquired new equipment, like a linear accelerator, a new CT and opened its ICU.

Accident
As in most radiotherapy departments, the one at ION uses a treatment planning system (TPS) to calculate the resulting dose distributions and determine treatment times. The data for each shielding block should be entered into the TPS separately. The TPS allows a maximum of four shielding blocks per field to be taken into account when calculating treatment times and dose distributions. Shielding blocks are used to protect healthy tissue of patients undergoing radiotherapy at the Institute, as is the normal practice.

In order to satisfy the request of a radiation oncologist to include five blocks in the field, in August 2000 the method of digitizing shielding blocks was changed. It was found that it was possible to enter data into the TPS for multiple shielding blocks together as if they were a single block, thereby apparently overcoming the limitation of four blocks per field. As was found later, although the TPS accepted entry of the data for multiple shielding blocks as if they were a single block, at least one of the ways in which the data were entered the computer output indicated a treatment time substantially longer than it should have been. The result was that patients received a proportionately higher dose than that prescribed. The modified treatment protocol was used for 28 patients, who were treated between August 2000 and March 2001 for prostate cancer and cancer of the cervix. There were eight deaths and 20 injuries.

The modified protocol was used without a verification test, i.e. a manual calculation of the treatment time for comparison with the computer calculated treatment time, or a simulation of treatment by irradiating a water phantom and measuring the dose delivered. In spite of the treatment times being about twice those required for correct treatment, the error went unnoticed. Some early symptoms of excessive exposure were noted in some of the irradiated patients. The seriousness, however, was not realized, with the consequence that the accidental exposure went unnoticed for a number of months. The continued emergence of these symptoms, however, eventually led to the accidental exposure being detected in March 2001.

In May 2001, the Government of Panama requested assistance under the terms of the Convention on Assistance in the Case of a Nuclear Accident or Radiological Emergency. In its response, the International Atomic Energy Agency (IAEA) sent a team of five medical doctors and two physicists to Panama to perform a dosimetric and medical assessment of the accidental exposure and a medical evaluation of the affected patients’ prognosis and treatment. The team was complemented by a physicist from the Pan American Health Organization (PAHO), also at the request of the Government of Panama.

The accidental exposures at the ION in Panama were very serious. Many patients have suffered severe radiation effects due to excessive dose. Both morbidity and mortality have increased significantly. 

The IAEA report was consistent with the report made by local investigators. It was found that the radiotherapy equipment was properly calibrated and worked properly. The error was on the data entry, using a protocol not validated to enter more shielding blocks, that resulted in increased dose in the treatment. Most of the exposed patients have died, some radiation related, others by means of their advanced cancer. The Government of Panama agreed to share urgently the conclusions of the report to help prevent similar accidents. The physicists of ION involved were taken to trial by the patients' families.

References

External links
 Official Website
 Investigation of an accidental Exposure of radiotherapy patients in Panama – International Atomic Energy Agency

Buildings and structures in Panama City
Hospital buildings completed in 1940
Hospitals in Panama
Hospitals established in 1936
Radiation accidents and incidents
1936 establishments in Panama